Angela's Ashes is a 1999 drama film based on the memoir of the same name by Frank McCourt. An international co-production between the United States, the United Kingdom and Ireland, it was co-written and directed by Alan Parker, and stars Emily Watson, Robert Carlyle, Joe Breen, Ciaran Owens, and Michael Legge, the latter three playing the Young, Middle, and Older Frank McCourt, respectively.

Plot

Frank McCourt and his family live in America, and shortly after the birth of their first daughter Margaret, she dies. Frank's mother Angela slips into depression, his drunkard father Malachy Sr. leaves for several days and they are left without food. Frank and his brother Malachy Jr. get help from his neighbors, who give food to them and their twin younger brothers Eugene and Oliver. The neighbors send a letter to Angela's relatives in Ireland for money to buy tickets to return to Ireland.

After their return, Malachy Sr. tries to collect money for his military service, but as there is no record of it he is turned away. Both of the twins die shortly after their arrival. Malachy Sr. is unable to keep a job, and squanders their money on alcohol. He is too proud to beg or to collect much needed coal from the streets.

The McCourt family's small house is at the end of a street, and the entire street shares one lavatory outside their front door. Angela has to beg for furniture from charitable organizations while Malachy Sr. signs up for the dole. The boys come home one day to find the downstairs has badly flooded, and their parents are upstairs where their new brother Michael has been born.

Malachy Sr. berates Angela for begging for clothes and boots for the boys and tries to prove his worth as a husband and father. The boys are tormented in school for their ratty shoes, so Frank hides his. His teacher reprimands the class for bullying Frank, and for taking pleasure in each other's misfortunes. Malachy Sr. looks for work daily but his "funny manner" and northern Ireland accent make him unsuccessful. Around Easter Malachy Sr. gets a job in Limerick, at the cement factory. He spends his earnings in the pub rather than on food for his family. One night, he arrives home singing old songs about Ireland, getting the boys out of bed and making them promise to die for Ireland. He oversleeps and loses his job the next day.

At school the boys learn how to take communion bread/wafers. They are taken to church from school and are each told to go in for a first confession. Frank sleeps in on the day of his first communion and his grandmother reacts harshly, as she tries to rectify the situation, criticising Frank and Malachy Sr. Frank is eager to "make the collection", which is when young people who've just had their first communion wander around the town in their new communion clothes so the neighbours give them sweets and money.

Frank's grandmother takes the family to hers for a communion breakfast but Frank vomits it up. His grandmother marches him back to the church to confess. As Frank misses the collection he still wants to celebrate. He manages to sneak into the cinema with his friend Mikey's help. Frank's parents sign him up for Irish dancing, which he hates. He takes the money his mother gives him for the lessons and goes to the cinema, unknown to his parents. As a cover, he makes up dances at home for them.

Angela gives birth to another baby, Alphie, and Frank's grandparents send money which Malachy Sr. wastes at the pub. Angela sends Frank to the pub to loudly announce he'd stolen the money for the baby to shame him into coming home. When he arrives to collect his father, Frank decides not to try to bring Malachy Sr. home as a man that would steal money meant for his baby is beyond help.

Frank contracts typhoid and is near death, but recovers over two months. He enjoys his time in the hospital, reading Shakespeare without interruption. However, he is crestfallen to find his father at home with Alphie, meaning that he lost another job. Frank has to repeat a year of school as he missed so much time while in hospital. A composition he writes about Jesus being born in Limerick instead of Bethlehem so impresses the school to move him back into his grade.

As World War II breaks out, Malachy Sr. goes to work at a factory in England to support the war effort. Angela tells the boys they only have to wait a few weeks for him to send them a telegram money order, but is soon forced to beg for leftovers from the church. Frank has to work as a teenager as his father sends no money and the family needs food. He delivers coal, but has to quit when he develops conjunctivitis from the coal dust.

Two days before Christmas, Angela is forced to beg for a food voucher again after Malachy Sr. fails to return from England. The next day, he comes home but without any money for the family. Angela, Frank, and Malachy Jr. accuse him of drinking it away. On Christmas Day, he returns to London. A week later, they receive a money order telegram, but none are sent after that, and he never again returned to his family.

The family is evicted and Frank's grandmother dies of pneumonia. They move in with Laman Griffin, who doesn't charge them rent but makes Angela cook and clean for him. Frank does well in school but wants to drop out to get a job that pays weekly so he can go to the movies every weekend. When Frank discovers Angela has been sleeping with Griffin as part of their arrangement, he has a physical altercation with Griffin, then goes to stay with his uncle Pa and aunt Aggie.

Aggie buys Frank clothes for his new job at the post office delivering telegrams. He starts a relationship with Theresa, a girl he meets on his route, but she soon dies from consumption. Frank blames himself for her death, thinking God punished her for their premarital sex. He later delivers a telegram to moneylender Mrs. Finucane, who hires him to write nonpayment letters to borrowers in arrears.

Frank's uncle buys him his first pint at the pub, and he returns home drunk. Angela witnesses his return, berating him for being like his father. Angry, he lashes out at her for sleeping with Griffin and slaps her. Frank goes to confession and the priest reassures him that Theresa is in heaven and her death wasn't a punishment.

When Frank discovers Mrs. Finucane dead in her home, he takes all of her money and her debt ledger. He destroys the ledger and buys a ticket to America on a boat out of Cork. The night before he leaves, his family witnesses a lunar eclipse and his uncle Pa tells him it is a sign of good luck. The film ends with Frank reaching America and seeing the Statue of Liberty.

Cast

Production
Although set in Limerick, many street scenes were filmed in Cork. For example, the 'fleas in the mattress' scene was filmed at Farren Street, Blackpool and other scenes were shot at Roche's Buildings, Lower John Street and Barrack Street.

Reception
With an estimated $25 million budget, the film grossed $13,042,112 in the US, making it a box-office bomb.

On Rotten Tomatoes, the film has an approval rating of 52%, based on reviews from 87 critics, with an average rating of 5.8/10. The site's consensus states: "In spite of its attempts to accurately record Frank McCourt's memoirs, the onscreen adaptation fails to capture any of the drama or humor of his life". On Metacritic, the film has a score of 54 out of 100, based on reviews from 32 critics, indicating "mixed or average reviews".

Michael Legge was praised for his portrayal of the adolescent Frank. In particular, he was said to excel in his role as an innocent teenager growing up with typical coming of age rites involving sexuality, maturity and peer pressure in a Catholic Irish setting.

Differences from the book
 In the book, the opening paragraph describes Angela's upbringing. It tells how Angela's brother Pat became developmentally disabled by being dropped on the ground by Angela's father throwing him in the air, and that Angela's pregnant mother told him to leave, so he "ran out the door and didn't stop till he got to Australia". The film omits this.
 In the film, when Angela suggests naming Frank's new brother Alphonsus, and Frank exclaims that it's a stupid name, Aggie smacks the back of Frank's head. In the book, Angela slaps Frank across the face so hard he reels backwards.
 In the film, Frank says that Irish dancers look like they have metal rods up their arses, but in the book it is Frank's father who says that.
 The end of the film shows Frank sailing past the Statue of Liberty as he arrives in New York City. In the book he lands at Poughkeepsie.

Awards
 Winner Best Picture – Irish Film and Television Awards
 Winner Best Costume Design – Irish Film and Television Awards (Consolata Boyle)
 Winner Best Director – Karlovy Vary International Film Festival (Audience Award) (Alan Parker)
 Winner Best Original Score – Las Vegas Film Critics Society (John Williams)
 Winner Best Actress – London Film Critics Circle (Emily Watson)
 Nominee Best Original Score – Academy Awards (John Williams)
 Nominee Best Original Score – Golden Globes (John Williams)
 Nominee Best Actress – BAFTA (Emily Watson)
 Nominee Best Cinematography – BAFTA (Michael Seresin)
 Nominee Best Production Design – BAFTA (Geoffrey Kirkland)
 Nominee Best British Film – Empire Awards
 Nominee Best British Actor – Empire Awards (Robert Carlyle)
 Nominee Best Actress – Irish Film and Television Awards (Emily Watson)
 Nominee Best Actor – Irish Film and Television Awards (Robert Carlyle)
 Nominee Newcomer of Year – London Film Critics Circle Awards (Michael Legge)

Soundtrack

The film soundtrack was composed and conducted by John Williams, and features songs by Billie Holiday and Sinéad O'Connor with narration on tracks 2, 4–15 and 17 by actor Andrew Bennett. Williams was nominated for the Academy Award for Best Original Score in 2000 for his score but lost to The Red Violin, scored by John Corigliano.

Home media
Angela's Ashes was originally released in the United Kingdom and Ireland on VHS and DVD format on 17 July 2000, via Universal Pictures Home Entertainment. The DVD set retained the film's original aspect ratio of 1.85:1, with Dolby Digital 5.1, and included a number of special features, including, a behind-the-scenes featurette, cast and crew interviews, commentaries by Alan Parker and Frank McCourt, and two trailers. This set was again re-issued in 2003 with identical artwork, while the only difference being the redesigning of the BBFC certificate logo, which updated in 2002. A DVD box set release was made available on 8 September 2008, which included the DVD and the original book.

The film was additionally released within multiple sets, including a three-tape VHS set which features the film with Billy Elliot and Stepmom, on 15 September 2003, and a "Back 2 Back" VHS edition with Billy Elliot on 16 February 2004, The set containing the film with Billy Elliot and Stepmom was released once again as part of a "3 Disc Anthology" DVD set on 2 October 2005.

On 31 October 2016, Angela's Ashes received its first-ever Blu-ray release via Final Cut Entertainment. It contains a newly remastered HD transfer, with DTS-HD Master Audio 5.1, as well as LPMC 2.0 audio. All special features from the previous DVD releases are included, with the inclusion of a new feature, "Alan's Ashes"—an interview with Alan Parker.

In the United States and Canada, the distribution rights are held by Paramount Home Entertainment. Angela's Ashes was first released on VHS format, while the film was released to DVD as part of Paramount's "Widescreen Collection" on 18 July 2000, and contained a non-anamorphic-widescreen letterboxed version. A "Special Edition" VHS was made available on 5 December 2000. The DVD received a re-issue on 20 September 2017.

References

External links

 
 
 

1999 films
American coming-of-age drama films
British coming-of-age drama films
1990s American films
1990s British films
1990s coming-of-age drama films
English-language Irish films
Irish coming-of-age drama films
Irish Diaspora films
1999 drama films
1990s English-language films
Films based on memoirs
Films set in Brooklyn
Films set in Ireland
Films set in the 1930s
Films set in the 1940s
Films shot in Ireland
Films scored by John Williams
Films with screenplays by Alan Parker
Films produced by Scott Rudin
Films produced by David Brown
Films directed by Alan Parker
Paramount Pictures films
Universal Pictures films